The Ultimate Vanessa-Mae is a compilation album by Vanessa-Mae, released on EMI in 2003 (see 2003 in music).

Track listing
 "Classical Gas" (Mason Williams) – 3:48
 "I Feel Love" (Pete Bellotte, Giorgio Moroder, Donna Summer) – 4:26
 "Picante" (Vanessa-Mae, Martin Glover) – 2:59
 "Red Hot" (Vanessa-Mae, Ian Wherry) – 4:34
 "Yantra" (Vanessa-Mae, Glover) – 5:52
 "Bach Street Prelude" (Vanessa-Mae, J.S. Bach, Andy Hill) – 4:29
 "Leyenda" (Vanessa-Mae, Hill) – 6:35
 "Cotton Eye Joe" (Live) (Traditional) – 3:19
 "(I) Can, Can (You?)" (Vanessa-Mae, Hill, Jacques Offenbach) – 3:42
 "Widescreen" (Mike Batt) – 4:01
 "Night Flight" (Vanessa-Mae, Glover) – 4:41
 "Toccata and Fugue in d minor, BWV 565 (Live)" (Bach, Batt) – 4:41
 "The Original Four Seasons, Op. 8, No. 1 "Spring": Allegro" (Vanessa-Mae, Antonio Vivaldi, Pamela Nicholson) – 3:11
 "Scherzo in C Minor for Violin & Piano" (Johannes Brahms) – 5:22

Vanessa-Mae albums
2003 compilation albums
EMI Records compilation albums
Albums produced by Mike Batt